Kaeng Khoi Junction railway station is a railway station located in Kaeng Khoi Subdistrict, Kaeng Khoi district, Saraburi province. It opened on May 1, 1897 as part of the Northeastern Line Ayutthaya–Kaeng Khoi Junction section. In 1956, the station became a junction when a line branched off to Suranarai Station. Then in 1995, another line from Khlong Sip Kao Junction for freight trains only linked to the Northeastern Mainline.

Train services 
 Special Express No. 21/22 Bangkok–Ubon Ratchathani–Bangkok
 Express No. 67/68 Bangkok–Ubon Ratchathani–Bangkok
 Special Express No. 25/26 Bangkok–Nong Khai–Bangkok
 Express No. 71/72 Bangkok–Ubon Ratchathani–Bangkok
 Express No. 75/78 Bangkok–Nong Khai–Bangkok
 Express No. 77/76 Bangkok–Nong Khai–Bangkok
 Rapid No. 133/134 Bangkok–Nong Khai–Bangkok
 Rapid No. 135/140 Bangkok–Ubon Ratchathani–Bangkok
 Rapid No. 139/146 Bangkok–Ubon Ratchathani–Bangkok
 Rapid No. 141/142 Bangkok–Ubon Ratchathani–Bangkok
 Rapid No. 145/136 Bangkok–Ubon Ratchathani–Bangkok
 Ordinary No. 233/234 Bangkok–Surin–Bangkok
 Commuter No. 339/340 Bangkok–Kaeng Khoi Junction–Bangkok (weekdays only)
 Commuter No. 341/342 Bangkok–Kaeng Khoi Junction–Bangkok 
 Local No. 431/432 Kaeng Khoi Junction–Khon Kaen–Kaeng Khoi Junction (via Nakhon Ratchasima)
 Local No. 433/434 Kaeng Khoi Junction–Bua Yai Junction–Kaeng Khoi Junction (via Lam Narai)
 Local No. 437/438 Kaeng Khoi Junction–Lam Narai–Kaeng Khoi Junction
 Local No. 439/440 Kaeng Khoi Junction–Bua Yai Junction–Kaeng Khoi Junction (via Lam Narai)

References 
 
 

Railway stations in Thailand
Railway stations opened in 1897